Jim Sonzero is a music video and film director. He co-directed Mariah Carey's "Can't Let Go." His feature length directorial debut was Pulse, a horror film starring Kristen Bell. He was the cutscene director for Killzone 3 and Resident Evil 5.

External links

American film directors
American music video directors
Living people
Year of birth missing (living people)
Place of birth missing (living people)